Friends Club is a Nepali professional football club from the Kopundole neighborhood of Lalitpur. The club is known for nurturing young talent of Nepalese Football. Friends Club has produced more than 200 national football players to date.  It also organized certain social activities like reading room facilities, blood donations, bicycle rallies against drug abuse etc.

Since the late 1980s, it has implemented different training activities for women and children. The team practices on the grounds of Pulchok Campus. National players like Raju Tamang, Bharat Khawas, Sagar Thapa, Nirajan Khadka or Deepak Bhusal are all products of Friends Club Martyr's Memorial A-Division League.

History
Friends club was established in 1972 as a children's club with reading room facility in Kopundol. After couple of year of its establishment, the club diversified its social activities with a motto of "better health through sports among the people of Kopundol." Eventually Friends Club established itself as a well reputed local sports club and for next several years, it remained only as a football club that every now and then organized certain social activities like reading room facility, blood donation, bicycle rally against drugs abuse etc. It was since late eighties that the Club started implementing various training activities for women and children. It also started a health clinic and Pathology laboratory which eventually, became very popular among the people of Kopundol and surrounding community. The club has come a long way since 1972 until now from a sports club to a sport-cum social club.

Achievements
 Tribhuvan Challenge Shield (3): 1985, 1986, Unknown
 Mahendra Gold cup (2): Unknown
 Birthday Cup runner up (1): 2042 (BS)
 Birthday Cup (1): 2002
 Birgunj (2): Unknown
 Martyr's Memorial League runner-up (1): Unknown
 Tillotama Gold Cup runner-up (1): Unknown
 Itahari Gold Cup runner-up (1): Unknown
 Sahid Smarak League runner-up (6): Unknown

Head coaching record
updated on 14 May 2020

League finishes 
The season-by-season performance of FC since 2000:

References

External links
 Official website at friendsclub.org.np

Football clubs in Nepal
1972 establishments in Nepal